Woden or Odin is the chief god of the Germanic mythology.

Woden may also refer to:
List of places named after Woden
 Woden is a district of the city of Canberra, Australia: 
 Woden Valley  
 Woden Town Centre
 Woden, Iowa, a small town in the United States
 2155 Wodan, an asteroid
 Woden (album) by Julian Cope

See also
Wodenism, Anglo-Saxon paganism
Wotan (disambiguation)
Odin (disambiguation)